The 2015 season is RoPS's 3rd Veikkausliiga season since their promotion back to the top flight in 2012.

Squad

Transfers

Winter

In:

Out:

Summer

In:

Out:

Competitions

Veikkausliiga

League table

Results

Finnish Cup

League Cup

Group stage

Knockout stage

Squad statistics

Appearances and goals

|-
|colspan="14"|Trialist:

|-
|colspan="14"|Players from Santa Claus who appeared:

|-
|colspan="14"|Players who left RoPS during the season:

|}

Goal scorers

Disciplinary record

References

External links
 Official website

Rovaniemen Palloseura seasons
Rops